Lukas Rafael Hespanhol Ruiz (born July 7, 1993), known as Vintage Culture, is a Brazilian DJ and record producer. He had a great ascent releasing remixes of songs like "Blue Monday" by New Order and "Another Brick in the Wall" by Pink Floyd, these songs went viral together with his versions of "Bete Balanço" by Cazuza and "Bidolibido"  by Fernanda Abreu.

Vintage Culture is also record company manager at Só Track Boa.

Biography 
In 2015, Vintage Culture appeared in #118 in the Top DJs list of British magazine DJ MAG and #2 on the list of best Brazilian DJs House Mag. In 2016, he achieved the 54º position  and in 2017, he climbed the rank up to hold the best position of his career, being considered the #31 best DJ of the year.

In 2016, he released the EP Hollywood by Ganza Seal Skol Music in partnership with Spinnin Records. Soon after he charted his remix of "Drinkee" for double Sofi Tukker released by Ultra Music at # 4 Dance chart of Beatport and even after a month of release has remained in the Top 10 with it. But it was with "Wild Kidz" released by Spinnin Records that Vintage Culture began to gain international recognition, the song entered the "Global Viral" Spotify and received support Oliver Heldens, EDX and Sam Feldt.

Discography

Extended plays 
 2016 Hollywood, Ganzá, N.5 iTunes Electronic

Singles

Remixes 
 2016: Sofi Tukker — Drinkee (Vintage Culture Remix)
 2016: Joy Corporation — Do You Remember (Vintage Culture Remix)
 2017: Martin Garrix and Troye Sivan - There For You (Vintage Culture and Kohen Remix)
 2018: Bob Sinclar - World Hold On (Vintage Culture and Dubdogz Remix)
 2019: Martin Garrix featuring Macklemore and Patrick Stump of Fall Out Boy - Summer Days (Vintage Culture and Bruno Be Remix)
 2020: Maverick Sabre featuring Jorja Smith - Slow Down (Vintage Culture and Slow Motion Remix)
 2020: Rompasso - Paradise (Vintage Culture Remix)
 2020: Winona Oak and Robin Schulz - Oxygen (Vintage Culture and Fancy Inc Remix)
 2020: Moby featuring Mindy Jones - My Only Love (Vintage Culture Remix)
 2020: Felix Jaehn featuring Nea and Bryn Christopher - No Therapy (Vintage Culture Remix)
 2021: Bob Moses and Zhu - Desire (Vintage Culture & Kiko Franco Remix)
 2021: Louie Vega and Marc E. Bassy - Let It Go (Vintage Culture Remix)
 2021: Meduza - Paradise (Vintage Culture Remix)
 2021: Steve Angello, Laidback Luke, and Robin S - Show Me Love (Vintage Culture Remix)
 2021: John Summit - Beauty Sleep (Vintage Culture Remix)
 2021: Tiësto - The Business (Vintage Culture and Dubdogz Remix)
 2021: Aleyna Tilki - Retrograde (Vintage Culture Remix)
 2021: Diplo featuring Elderbrook and Andhim - One By One (Vintage Culture Remix)
 2021: Rüfüs Du Sol - Next to Me (Vintage Culture Remix)
 2021: Claptone featuring Seal - Just A Ghost (Vintage Culture Remix)
 2021: Kasablanca - Hold Me Close (Vintage Culture Remix)
 2021: Burns - Talamanca (Vintage Culture Remix)
 2021: Chris Lorenzo - California Dreamin' (with High Jinx) [Vintage Culture Remix]

Awards and nominations

Filmography

Music videos

Web series

On The Road 
In its 10th episode, the series web can be considered a mini documentary about the life, career and the artist's career. In the series, the testimony of Vintage Culture are interspersed with behind the scenes, concerts and studio sessions, and some periods off with friends.

WKND Hi Lights 
In short videos of one minute on average, Vintage Culture presents to the public a summary of their weekends.

Awards and indicated

DJ Mag 
N. 118 no TOP 100 DJs DJ Mag (2015)
N. 19 no TOP 100 DJs DJ Mag (2018)

House Mag 
N.2 no TOP 50 DJS House Mag (2015)

Rio Music Conference 
Melhor DJ Big Room (2015)

References 

Streamy Award winners
Brazilian Internet celebrities
Brazilian DJs
Brazilian house musicians
Remixers
Electro house musicians
1993 births
Living people
Electronic dance music DJs